This article lists the albums attributed to the anime series Jewelpet.

Singles

"Maji? Maji! Magical☆Jewel"

 is the single by Yui Asaka and Horie Mitsuko which was used as the opening and ending themes to the anime Jewelpet. It was released on May 20, 2009 by Columbia Music Entertainment.

Track listing

"Happy Twinkle/Sora ni Rakugaki"

 is the single by Kayano Masuyama, Ayaka Saito, Miyuki Sawashiro, Natsumi Takamori, Ayana Taketatsu and Azusa Kataoka which was used as the opening and ending themes to the anime Jewelpet Twinkle. It is released on June 23, 2010 by Columbia Music Entertainment.

CD Track listing

"Go! Go! Sunshine/Imadoki Otome"

 is the single by Mayumi Gojo, Kayano Masuyama and Misuzu Mochizuki which was used as the opening and ending themes to the anime Jewelpet Sunshine. It is released on June 22, 2011 by Columbia Music Entertainment. The CD+DVD Edition includes a limited edition pen.

Track listing

Albums

Jewelpet: Happy Music

 is the official soundtrack album of the anime series Jewelpet released on April 21, 2010 by Columbia Music Entertainment It contains TV versions of both the opening and ending themes of the series and including the character song of Luna, Milky and Peridot performed by Rumi Shishido, Keiko Utsumi and Yuki Kaida.

Track listing

Jewelpet Twinkle☆: Happy Happy Music

 is the official soundtrack album of the anime series Jewelpet Twinkle☆, released on August 29, 2010 by Columbia Music Entertainment. Like Jewelpet: Happy Music, the soundtrack also contains TV versions of both the opening and ending themes of the series.

Track listing

Jewelpet: Kirapika☆Song

 is the compilation soundtrack album of both the anime series Jewelpet and Jewelpet Twinkle, released on December 1, 2010 by Columbia Music Entertainment. The album contains the theme songs and insert songs of both series as well as new ones from the Sanrio Puroland Events and musicals.

Track listing
  (Kayano Masuyama feat. Ruby and Labra)
  (Yui Asaka)
  (Luna, Milky and Peridot)
  (Miria)
  (Ruby)) (From the Sanrio Puroland Event "Magical March")
  (Ruby) (From the Sanrio Puroland Event "Magical March")
  (Ruby) (From the Sanrio Puroland Event "Magical March")
  (Ruby, Labra and Sapphy) (From the Sanrio Puroland Event "Jewelpet and Cinnamon: Future Revolution")
  (Ruby, Labra and Sapphy) (From the Sanrio Puroland Event "Jewelpet and Cinnamon: Future Revolution")
  (Ruby, Labra and Sapphy) (From the Sanrio Puroland Event "Jewelpet and Cinnamon: Future Revolution")
  (Akari, Miria and Sara)
  (Horie Mitsuko)

Jewelpet Sunshine: Happyx3 Music

 (Spelled as "Happy Happy Happy") is the official soundtrack album of the anime series Jewelpet Sunshine released on July 20, 2011 by Columbia Music Entertainment. It contains TV versions of both the opening and ending themes of the series.

Track listing
 
  (Mayumi Gojo)
 
 
 
 
 
 
 
 
 
 
 
 
 
 
 
 
 
 
 
 
 
 
 
 
 
 
 
 
 
 
 
 
 
 
 
 
 
 
 
 
 
 
 
 
 
   (Kayano Masuyama and Misuzu Mochizuki)

Jewelpet The Movie: Sweets Dance Princess Soundtrack

 is the official soundtrack album of the movie Jewelpet the Movie: Sweets Dance Princess, to be released on August 8, 2012 by Universal Music Japan. It contains the official music from the movie as well as the official opening song, Magic of Dreams.

Track listing
  (Mana Ashida)
 
 JEWEL FLASH JINGLE
 
 
 
 
 
 
 
 
 
 
 
 
 
 
 
 
 
 
 
 
 
 
 
 
 
 
 
 
 
 
 
  (Mana Ashida)

References

Anime soundtracks
Discographies of Japanese artists
Soundtracks
Lists of soundtracks